Marlies Waelzer (born 13 February 1970) is a German handball player. She competed in the women's tournament at the 1996 Summer Olympics.

References

External links
 

1970 births
Living people
German female handball players
Olympic handball players of Germany
Handball players at the 1996 Summer Olympics
Sportspeople from Hamburg